This was the first edition of the tournament.

Liam Broady won the title after defeating Zdeněk Kolář 6–4, 6–4 in the final.

Seeds

Draw

Finals

Top half

Bottom half

References

External links
Main draw
Qualifying draw

Vitas Gerulaitis Cup - 1